Emarlos S. Leroy (born July 31, 1975 in Albany, Georgia) is a former American football defensive tackle in the National Football League. He was drafted by the Jacksonville Jaguars in the six round of the 1999 NFL Draft. He played college football at Georgia.

References

1975 births
Living people
Sportspeople from Albany, Georgia
Georgia Bulldogs football players
Jacksonville Jaguars players
American football defensive tackles
Players of American football from Georgia (U.S. state)